Odanku  is a village development committee in Kalikot District in the Karnali Zone of north-western Nepal. It is the largest VDC in the district, located in the south-east of Kalikot District. At the time of the 1991 Nepal census it had a population of 2941 people living in 558 individual households.

Media 
To promote local culture, Odanku has one FM radio station: Radio Bheka Aawaj - 101.2 MHZ, a Community radio station.

References

External links
UN map of the municipalities of Kalikot District

Populated places in Kalikot District